Julija Stoliarenko (born 8 April 1993) is a Lithuanian mixed martial arts and Lethwei fighter. She currently competes in the Ultimate Fighting Championship in the Bantamweight division. A professional since 2012, she is the former Invicta FC Bantamweight Champion and ILFJ Women's Featherweight Lethwei World Champion.

Background
Stoliarenko's father introduced her to karate when she was 12, eventually progressing towards Brazilian jiu-jitsu and mixed martial arts.

Career

Lethwei
On June 16, 2017, Stoliarenko made her Lethwei debut at Lethwei in Japan 4: Frontier in Tokyo, Japan and knocked out Burmese Lethwei fighter Su Hlaing Oo.

On November 15, 2017, Stoliarenko faced top female Lethwei fighter in Vero Nika in Lethwei Grand Prix Japan 2017 in Tokyo and ultimately won the Japan Lethwei World Title by TKO.

On October 2, 2019, Stoliarenko made her first ILFJ title defence at Lethwei in Japan 14 and defeated Japanese fighter Yugia by TKO in the first round.

Mixed martial arts

The Ultimate Fighter 

In 2018, Julija Stoliarenko was a contestant on The Ultimate Fighter: Heavy Hitters. In the Ultimate Fighter finale Stoliarenko lost to Leah Letson.

Invicta FC 
On March 6, 2020, Julija defeated Liza Verzosa to win Invicta Bantamweight Championship.

Ultimate Fighting Championship 
On August 8, 2020, Stoliarenko faced Yana Kunitskaya at UFC Fight Night 174. She lost the fight via unanimous decision.

Stoliarenko was expected to face Julia Avila at UFC on ESPN 21 on March 20, 2021. However at the weigh ins, Stoliarenko suffered a syncopal episode on the scale and the fight was scrapped.  The pair was rescheduled and took place at UFC Fight Night 190. Stoliarenko lost the fight by submission in the third round.

Stoliarenko faced Alexis Davis at UFC Fight Night 200 on February 5, 2022. She lost the fight via unanimous decision.

Stoliarenko faced Jessica-Rose Clark on July 2, 2022 at UFC 276. She won the fight via armbar submission less than a minute into round one, thus earning her first victory in UFC in the process. This performance earned her the Performance of the Night bonus award.

Stoliarenko, as a replacement for Leah Letson, faced Chelsea Chandler in a catchweight bout of 140 pounds on October 1, 2022 at UFC Fight Night 211. She lost the bout via TKO stoppage at the end of the first round.

Championships and accomplishments

Mixed martial arts
 Ultimate Fighting Championship
 Performance of the Night (One time) 
 Invicta Fighting Championships
 Invicta FC Bantamweight Championship (One time)
 Celtic Gladiator 
 CG Bantamweight Champion (One time)

Lethwei
 International Lethwei Federation Japan
 ILFJ Women's Featherweight World Championship (Two times)

Mixed martial arts record

|-
|Loss
|align=center|10–7–2
|Chelsea Chandler
|TKO (punches)
|UFC Fight Night: Dern vs. Yan
|
|align=center|1
|align=center|4:15
|Las Vegas, Nevada, United States
|
|-
|Win
|align=center|10–6–2
|Jessica-Rose Clark
|Submission (armbar)
|UFC 276
| 
|align=center|1
|align=center|0:42
|Las Vegas, Nevada, United States
|
|-
|Loss
|align=center|9–6–2
|Alexis Davis
|Decision (unanimous)
|UFC Fight Night: Hermansson vs. Strickland
| 
|align=center|3
|align=center|5:00
|Las Vegas, Nevada, United States
|
|-
|Loss
|align=center|9–5–2
|Julia Avila
|Submission (rear-naked choke)
|UFC Fight Night: Gane vs. Volkov 
|
|align=center|3
|align=center|4:19
|Las Vegas, Nevada, United States
|
|-
|Loss
|align=center|9–4–2
|Yana Kunitskaya
|Decision (unanimous)
|UFC Fight Night: Lewis vs. Oleinik
|
|align=center|3
|align=center|5:00
|Las Vegas, Nevada, United States
|
|-
| Win
| align=center| 9–3–2
| Lisa Verzosa
| Decision (split)
|  Invicta FC: Phoenix Series 3
| 
| align=center|5
| align=center| 5:00
| Kansas City, Kansas, United States
|
|-
| Win
| align=center| 8–3–2
| Maria Tatunashvili
| Submission (armbar)
| KOK'80 World Series 2019 in Lithuania
| 
| align=center|1
| align=center| 0:20
| Vilnius, Lithuania
|
|-
| Win
| align=center| 7–3–2
| Victoria Dvaraninovich
| Submission (armbar)
| KOK'78 World Series 2019 in Kaunas
| 
| align=center| 1
| align=center| 0:19
| Kaunas, Lithuania
|
|-
| Win
| align=center| 6–3–2
| Marta Waliczek
| Submission (armbar)
| Celtic Gladiator 24
| 
| align=center|1
| align=center| 0:30
| Bielsko-Biała, Poland
|
|-
| Win
| align=center| 5–3–2
| Natalya Dyachkova
| Submission (armbar)
| KOK'69 World Series 2019 in Vilnius
| 
| align=center|1
| align=center| 0:00
| Vilnius, Lithuania
|
|-
| Loss
| align=center| 4–3–2
| Leah Letson
| Decision (split)
| The Ultimate Fighter: Heavy Hitters Finale
| 
| align=center|3
| align=center|5:00
| Las Vegas, Nevada, United States
|
|-
| Win
| align=center| 4–2–2
| Alecia Zomkowski
| Submission (armbar)
| Bushido 74
| 
| align=center|1
| align=center|0:22
| Vilnius, Lithuania
|
|-
| Win
| align=center| 3–2–2
| Tatsiana Firsava
| Submission (armbar)
| KOK 55 World GP 2018 in Vilnius
| 
| align=center|1
| align=center|0:58
| Vilnius, Lithuania
|
|-
| Win
| align=center| 2–2–2
| Tetyana Voznyuk
| Submission (armbar)
| KOK World Series 2017 in Kaunas
| 
| align=center|1
| align=center|0:58
| Kaunas, Lithuania
|
|-
| Draw
| align=center|  1–2–2
| Martyna Czech
| Draw (majority)
| KOK World Series 2016 in Vilnius
| 
| align=center| 2
| align=center| 5:00
| Vilnius, Lithuania
|
|-
| Loss
| align=center| 1–2–1
| Lucie Pudilová
| TKO (corner stoppage)
| GCF Challenge - Back in the Fight 4
| 
| align=center| 2
| align=center| 5:00
| Příbram, Czech Republic
|
|-
| Loss
| align=center| 1–1–1
| Agnieszka Niedźwiedź
| TKO (elbows)
| Fighters Arena 9
| 
| align=center| 3
| align=center| 2:51
| Józefów, Poland
|
|-
| Win
| align=center| 1–0–1
| Eeva Siiskonen
| Submission (armbar)
| Carelia Fight 9
| 
| align=center| 1
| align=center| 1:25
| Imatra, Finland
|
|-
| Draw
| align=center| 0–0–1
| Evelyn Adomulyte
| Draw
| SWAT 30
| 
| align=center| 3
| align=center| 5:00
| Kaunas, Lithuania
|
|-

Lethwei record 

|-
|-  style="background:#cfc;"
| 2019-10-02|| Win ||align=left| Yuiga || Lethwei in Japan 14: Mysterious Tenmei || Tokyo, Japan || TKO || 1 || 0:36  
|-
! style=background:white colspan=9 |
|-  style="background:#cfc;"
| 2017-11-15|| Win ||align=left| Vero Nika || Lethwei Grand Prix Japan 2017 || Tokyo, Japan || TKO || 2 || 0:45  
|-
! style=background:white colspan=9 |
|-  style="background:#cfc;"
| 2017-06-16|| Win ||align=left| Su Hlaing Oo ||  Lethwei in Japan 4: Frontier || Tokyo, Japan || KO || 2 || 1:32 
|-
| colspan=9 | Legend:

References

External links
 
 

1993 births
Living people
Lithuanian female karateka
Lithuanian female mixed martial artists
Featherweight mixed martial artists
Lithuanian Lethwei practitioners
Lithuanian practitioners of Brazilian jiu-jitsu
Lithuanian kickboxers
Featherweight kickboxers
Bantamweight mixed martial artists
Ultimate Fighting Championship female fighters
Lithuanian people of Russian descent
Mixed martial artists utilizing American Kenpo
Mixed martial artists utilizing Lethwei
Mixed martial artists utilizing Brazilian jiu-jitsu
Sportspeople from Kaunas